Cameraria caryaefoliella is a moth of the family Gracillariidae. It is known from Ontario and Quebec in Canada, and the United States (including Georgia, Illinois, Florida, Kentucky, New York, Texas, Vermont, Wisconsin, Connecticut and Pennsylvania).

The wingspan is 6–7 mm. Adults are small and have reddish-orange forewings with three silvery-white bands. There are three generations per year.

The larvae feed on Carya species (including Carya cordiformis, Carya glabra, Carya illinoinensis, Carya ovata and Carya tomentosa) and Juglans species (including Juglans cinerea and Juglans nigra). They mine the leaves of their host plant. The mine has the form of an irregular, white blotch mine on the upperside of the leaf. Some are as large as 12–13 mm in diameter. The young larva is a sap feeder (on juices from the underlying cells that contain chlorophyll) during the first instar and forms a flat, epidermal, linear, pale green mine that is hardly noticeable. This linear mine gradually widens into a blotch mine and becomes more noticeable as the larvae change from sap feeders to tissue feeders. At this time, mines may appear as light-to-dark brown blisters on leaflets. Fresh mines are sometimes whitish and very noticeable. They are often referred to as frog eye. Blotch mines near the leaf edge are often a little drawn or puckered and thus tent-like in appearance.

Larvae pupate in flat, oval cocoons of densely woven silk within the upper blotch mine. The pupa wriggles free of the cocoon and breaks through the upper leaf surface.

References

External links
Cameraria at microleps.org
mothphotographersgroup

Cameraria (moth)

Moths of North America
Lepidoptera of Canada
Lepidoptera of the United States
Leaf miners
Moths described in 1859
Taxa named by Vactor Tousey Chambers